August Konow Fleischer (28 September 1841 – 4 April 1931) was a Norwegian railway engineer and manager. He was born in Bergen. He worked for the Norwegian State Railways from 1863, and was acting director-general from 1910 to 1912.

References

1841 births
1931 deaths
Engineers from Bergen
Norwegian State Railways (1883–1996) people